Dirk Bellemakers (born 19 January 1984) is a Dutch former professional road bicycle racer, who competed as a professional between 2008 and 2013.

References

External links

1984 births
Living people
Dutch male cyclists
Sportspeople from Eindhoven
Cyclists from North Brabant